Corsia is a plant genus.

Corsia may also refer to:
Corseia, town of ancient Boeotia, Greece
Corsia (island), an island in the Aegean Sea, Greece
Ted de Corsia, American actor
Carbon Offsetting and Reduction Scheme for International Aviation (CORSIA)